The Westfield Memorial Library is located at 550 East Broad Street, in Westfield, Union County, New Jersey, United States. It is the only public library in Westfield.

Renovations
This library was renovated five years ago to become more modern, comfortable, and technologically savvy. It features a comfortable seating lounge on the first floor with two large flat-screen TVs, and a DVD section with rentals for only 1 dollar a day. The first floor has a large children's section and also an area just for teens. The second floor is aimed more for adults. There is a magazine section, with a comfortable seating area, there are many computers that can be used by anyone, and there are tables and chairs set up for quiet studying. The complete non-fiction section is on the second floor, as well as newspapers and yearbooks from past years in Westfield. There are also community rooms set up which are available for a small fee for groups who may need a space. There are computers set up frequently around the campus, as well as free wireless internet.

Features of the website
The Westfield Memorial Library website has a lot of features that would be helpful to a reader. Some features that may be helpful to someone that can't make it to the library would be they can talk to a librarian live on the web, via a chatroom, 24 hours a day, 7 days a week. There are audio and e-books available to be downloaded, as well as free music to download. There is a link on the website to connect the unemployed to career resources, and there is also a Flickr photostream with pictures from past events at the library. On the website people can also renew books quickly and easily, and view the schedule of events at the library. There is an online newsletter, which shows upcoming events, meetings, movies playing, bands performing, and library hours. There is a link to click on which will help you borrow books from other libraries if the Westfield Memorial Library does not have it. A person can access this special program if they have a library card.

Museum Pass
The library participates in Museum Pass, a program that provides members access to over 17 local museums at no cost. To obtain a museum pass, you need to be a member of the Westfield Memorial Library, and you may borrow the passes. Some of the museums that are available through the program are the American Folk Art Museum, the American Museum of Natural History, and the Children's Museum of Manhattan.

Funding
The "Friends of the Westfield Memorial Library" help share information about the library, and fund money for the library. The "friends" were founded over 30 years ago, and since then, have donated more than $850,000 to the library. The money is raised through the annual book sale that is held at the library, and from the donations of the members of the board and the library itself.

External links
 
 

Public libraries in New Jersey
Westfield, New Jersey